The WSA World Series 2011 is a series of women's squash tournaments which are part of the Women's Squash Association (WSA) World Tour for the 2011 squash season. The WSA World Series tournaments are some of the most prestigious events on the women's tour. The best-performing players in the World Series events qualify for the annual 2011 WSA World Series Finals tournament. Nicol David won her first WSA World Series Squash Finals trophy, beating Madeline Perry in the final.

WSA World Series Ranking Points
WSA World Series events also have a separate World Series ranking. Points for this are calculated on a cumulative basis after each World Series event.

2011 Tournaments

World Series Standings 2011

Bold – The first eight players present for the final

See also
 WSA World Tour 2011
 WSA World Series
 Official Women's Squash World Ranking

References

External links 
 World Series Series Squash website

WSA World Tour seasons
2011 in squash